The golden-crowned spadebill (Platyrinchus coronatus) is a species of bird in the family Tyrannidae. It is found in Bolivia, Brazil, Colombia, Costa Rica, Ecuador, French Guiana, Guyana, Honduras, Nicaragua, Panama, Peru, Suriname, and Venezuela. Its natural habitat is subtropical or tropical moist lowland forests.

References

Further reading

Platyrinchus
Birds described in 1858
Taxonomy articles created by Polbot